The name Edburga ( or Ēadburg) may refer to:
Saint Edburga of Bicester, an English saint from the 7th century
Saint Edburga of Minster-in-Thanet (died 751), royal princess, the only daughter of King Centwine and Queen Engyth of Wessex in the 8th century of the Kent royal family
Saint Edburga of Repton (died c. 700), also known as Saint Eadburh (Edburga) of Repton
Saint Edburga of Winchester (died 960), also known as Edburga of Nunnaminster, daughter of King Edward the Elder
Eadburh of Mercia, daughter of King Offa of Mercia (reigned 757–796, his death) and wife of King Beorhtric of Wessex (reigned 786–802)
Eadburh, died c. 890, mother of Ealhswith, who was the wife of Alfred the Great

Old English given names